The Township of Somerville was a municipality located in the north-eastern corner of the former Victoria County, now the city of Kawartha Lakes.

Communities 
Burnt River
Kinmount
Union Creek
Baddow
Dongola

See also
List of townships in Ontario

Communities in Kawartha Lakes
Former township municipalities in Ontario